VB Watch is a Visual Basic programming utility. VB Watch consists of three tools for Visual Basic 6.0: Profiler, Protector and Debugger.

Profiler
VB Watch Profiler measures the speed of a running Visual Basic program. It displays the time spent in each procedure and/or a line of code. This information can be used in code optimization to detect bottleneck procedures and lines. The Profiler can also be used to measure code coverage during software testing.

Debugger
VB Watch Debugger monitors what happens inside a running Visual Basic program or library. It displays the call stack, execution trace, global variables and the number of live objects. 
The Debugger also allows one to add breakpoints in executable files.

External links
 VB Watch home page

Debuggers
Profilers
Software testing tools
Programming tools for Windows